Islington is a suburb on the western side of Christchurch city. 

The suburb is named after the London borough of Islington, perhaps because the borough had a  market for cattle, while the Christchurch area had a freezing works opened in 1889.

 and the Main South Line run past the southern side of Islington.

Demographics

Islington had a population of 969 at the 2018 New Zealand census, an increase of 63 people (7.0%) since the 2013 census, and an increase of 159 people (19.6%) since the 2006 census. There were 366 households. There were 495 males and 474 females, giving a sex ratio of 1.04 males per female. The median age was 37.8 years (compared with 37.4 years nationally), with 165 people (17.0%) aged under 15 years, 201 (20.7%) aged 15 to 29, 480 (49.5%) aged 30 to 64, and 123 (12.7%) aged 65 or older.

Ethnicities were 72.8% European/Pākehā, 16.7% Māori, 6.5% Pacific peoples, 14.9% Asian, and 2.2% other ethnicities (totals add to more than 100% since people could identify with multiple ethnicities).

The proportion of people born overseas was 21.7%, compared with 27.1% nationally.

Although some people objected to giving their religion, 50.5% had no religion, 37.2% were Christian, 1.2% were Hindu, 0.3% were Muslim and 4.0% had other religions.

Of those at least 15 years old, 72 (9.0%) people had a bachelor or higher degree, and 234 (29.1%) people had no formal qualifications. The median income was $34,400, compared with $31,800 nationally. The employment status of those at least 15 was that 438 (54.5%) people were employed full-time, 102 (12.7%) were part-time, and 33 (4.1%) were unemployed.

References

Suburbs of Christchurch
Populated places in Canterbury, New Zealand